Mark Alexander may refer to:
 
Mark Alexander (politician) (1792–1883), American lawyer
Mark Alexander (cricketer) (born 1962), English cricketer
Mark Alexander (keyboardist) (born 1963), pianist currently with the Neverland Express
Mark Alexander (painter) (born 1966), British artist
Mark J. Alexander (1911–2004), U.S. Army officer and paratrooper during World War II
Mark C. Alexander, New Jersey law professor and advisor to Barack Obama's first presidential campaign

See also
Marc Alexander (disambiguation)